The Madagascan large free-tailed bat (Tadarida fulminans) is a species of bat in the family Molossidae. It is found in Democratic Republic of the Congo, Kenya, Madagascar, Malawi, Rwanda, South Africa, Tanzania, Zambia, and Zimbabwe. Its natural habitat is savanna.

References

Tadarida
Bats of Africa
Taxonomy articles created by Polbot
Mammals described in 1903
Taxa named by Oldfield Thomas